Sir Francis Boynton, 4th Baronet (17 November 1677 – 16 September 1739), of Barmston in the East Riding of Yorkshire, was an English landowner and member of parliament.

Life
Boynton was the eldest son of the Reverend Henry Boynton, Rector of Barmston. He was educated at Beverley Grammar School and St John's College, Cambridge. Admitted at Gray's Inn in 1696, he became a barrister. He inherited the baronetcy on 22 December 1731, on the death of his cousin Sir Griffith Boynton, who had no children. He served in Parliament as member for Hedon from 1734 until his death five-and-a-half years later.

On 8 April 1703, he married Frances Heblethwayte, daughter of James Heblethwayte, and they had three children:
 Griffith Boynton (1712–1761), who succeeded to the baronetcy
 Francis Boynton
 Constance, who married Ralph Hutton

References

Boynton genealogy

|-

Boynton, Francis
Boynton, Francis
Alumni of St John's College, Cambridge
Boynton, Francis
Boynton, Francis, 4th Baronet
Boynton, Francis
English landowners
People educated at Beverley Grammar School